Shelburne Regional High School (SRHS) is a secondary school located in Shelburne, Nova Scotia. SRHS is part of the Tri-County Regional School Board and is the only high school in the town of Shelburne. The original high school was home to students for 53 years until a new high school was built in 2004.

Administration 

Jeff Rankin - Principal
Byron MacAlpine - Vice Principal

External links
Shelburne Regional High School 
Tri-County Regional School Board

High schools in Nova Scotia
Schools in Shelburne County, Nova Scotia